Raju Uncle is a 2005 Bengali romantic comedy-drama film directed by Haranath Chakraborty and produced by Pijush Saha  The film features actors Prosenjit Chatterjee and Sayantani Ghosh in the lead roles. Music for the film was composed by Ashok Raj.

Plot
Raju, a young teacher lives with a group of orphans at his mortgaged house. Raju is honest but poor, he always search for a job and finally finds a job of detective.

Cast 
 Prosenjit Chatterjee as Raju/ Raju Uncle
 Sayantani Ghosh as Neela, Raju's love interest
 Ranjit Mallick as Ranjit Mallick, Head of Detective Agency
 Rajesh Sharma as Dilip Roy
 Kanchan Mullick as Keshto
 Monu Mukhopadhyay as Mukherjee Babu
 Arun Banerjee as Suren Roy, Manager
 Anamika Saha as Neelima (Neela's Step-Mother)
 Dolon Ray as Mala, Keshto's love interest
 Nimu Bhowmick as Autodriver, Mala's father
 Nilabhra Sett as Student of J.K School (child role)

Soundtrack

References

External links 
 Raju Uncle at the Gomolo

2000s Bengali-language films
2005 films
Bengali-language Indian films
Indian romantic comedy-drama films
Indian romantic comedy films
Films directed by Haranath Chakraborty